Xu Leiran (1918 – 26 June 2009), better known by her pen name Leiran, was a Chinese female translator and a member of the China Writers Association.

Xu was most notable for being one of the main translators into Chinese of the works of the Russian novelists Ivan Turgenev and Alexander Alexandrovich Fadeyev.

Biography
Xu was born Xu Yizeng in Shanghai in 1918.

Xu secondary studied at Zhongxi High School for Girls. Xu graduated from University of Shanghai and Saint John's University, Shanghai.

Xu started to publish works in 1941 and she worked in Times Publishing Company in 1944.

Xu joined the China Writers Association in 1949.

After the founding of the Communist State, Xu was transferred from Shanghai to Beijing where she was appointed an editor in the People's Literature Publishing House.

Xu died in Beijing in 2009.

Works
 Destruction (Alexander Alexandrovich Fadeyev)
 The Young Guards (Alexander Alexandrovich Fadeyev)
 The pedagogical poem (Anton Makarenko)
 Day and Night (Konstantin Simonov)
 Rudin (Ivan Turgenev)
 Home of the Gentry (Ivan Turgenev)
 The Captain's Daughter (Aleksandr Sergeyevich Pushkin)
 Dead Souls (Nikolai Gogol)
 Anna Karenina (Leo Tolstoy)
 The Mother (Maxim Gorky)
 (Aleksandr Kuprin)

Awards
 Chinese Translation Association – Competent Translator (2004)

Personal life
Xu was married to her university friend Ye Shuifu, he also was a Chinese translator.

References

1918 births
2009 deaths
Writers from Shanghai
Shanghai University alumni
St. John's University, Shanghai alumni
People's Republic of China translators
Russian–Chinese translators
20th-century Chinese translators
21st-century Chinese translators